The Pratt & Whitney PW2000, also known by the military designation F117 and initially referred to as the JT10D, is a series of high-bypass turbofan aircraft engines with a thrust range from . Built by Pratt & Whitney, they were designed for the Boeing 757. As a 757 powerplant, these engines compete with the Rolls-Royce RB211.

Design and development

Pratt & Whitney began working on the JT10D in October 1971 intended for the McDonnell Douglas YC-15 into the Advanced Medium STOL Transport project and the Boeing 767, then code named 7X7, which first ran in August 1974.  In December 1980, Pratt & Whitney changed to a new naming system for its engines and the JT10D became the PW2037.

The PW2000 is a dual-spool, axial air flow, annular combustion, high bypass turbofan with a dual-channel Full authority digital engine control (FADEC) system. It was certified in 1984 as the first civilian FADEC-controlled aviation engine.

MTU Aero Engines holds a 21.2% stake in the engine, having developed the low-pressure turbine and turbine exit casing as well as producing critical parts of the low-pressure turbine, the turbine exhaust casing, high-pressure compressor and high-pressure turbine components.

The first PW2000 series engine, the PW2037, powered the Boeing 757-200 and entered service with Delta Air Lines as the launch customer for the civil aviation version of the engine.

Other than the 757, the PW2000 series engines also power the C-17 Globemaster III military transport; the United States Department of Defense designation for the engine is F117, with the specific variant used on the C-17 being the F117-PW-100.  The powerplant first flew on the C-17 in 1991.

The PW2000 also powered the abortive Ilyushin Il-96M; the engine first flew on the Il-96M in 1993.

On October 16, 2008 the NTSB recommended that the FAA issue urgent new inspection procedures on the PW2037 model of the engine, following an uncontained turbine failure event in August 2008. The NTSB recommended that the FAA order PW2037 engines inspected beyond a threshold of flight hours or flight cycles less than that of the event engine, and be reinspected at regular intervals.

The latest build standard, named PW2043, launched in 1994. Previous generations of engines can be converted to the PW2043 version.

Applications
 Boeing 757
Boeing C-32A
 Boeing C-17 Globemaster III
 Ilyushin Il-96M

Specifications (PW2000)

See also

References

External links

Pratt & Whitney F117
Pratt & Whitney PW2000

High-bypass turbofan engines
PW2000
1980s turbofan engines